George Hull Reid (16 January 1896 – 1967) was an Irish professional footballer, who played for Blackpool, Walsall, Cardiff City, Fulham, Stockport County, Rotherham County and represented Ireland.

Career

After starting his career in his home country, Reid moved to The Football League in 1920, signing for Blackpool. After only a handful of appearances for the club he joined Walsall where his talent for scoring began to emerge, finishing as the sides top scorer in his first season with 22 goals in 34 league games. The following season, he had scored 9 goals in 13 matches when he moved to Cardiff City in December 1922, scoring on his debut in a 5–1 defeat to Manchester City. Four months after joining the Welsh side, Reid was handed his first and only cap for Ireland when he played in a 1–0 defeat to Scotland on 3 March 1923.

However, he was forced out of the Cardiff side by Len Davies and was unable to regain his place prompting a move to Fulham in 1923. Reid would go on to make just 25 league appearances in the Football League with short spells at Stockport County and Rotherham County before moving into non-league football with Mid Rhondda United, just two years after making his international debut.

References
Specific

General

1896 births
Year of death missing
Irish association footballers (before 1923)
Pre-1950 IFA international footballers
Blackpool F.C. players
Walsall F.C. players
Cardiff City F.C. players
Fulham F.C. players
Stockport County F.C. players
Rotherham County F.C. players
English Football League players
Association football forwards